John Vernon Rob  (17 December 1915 - 7 March 1971) was a British diplomat and the first British High Commissioner to Singapore.

Rob was born in Chertsey, Surrey and educated at Hordle House School, Oundle School and St John's College, Cambridge. In 1939 he joined the Consular Service but in September 1940 he enlisted on the Scots Guards.   Rob was seriously wounded in 1945 in Italy.

Rob returned to the Foreign Office at the end of the war  becoming deputy head of the News Department for three years, he later became a Counseller in New Delhi and Warsaw. Between 1960 and 1962 he was the British Ambassador to the Central African Republic, Chad, Gabon and Congo.

In 1965 Rob was appointed Deputy Commissioner in Singapore, becoming the High Commissioner when Singapore became independent of Malaysia. He returned to the United Kingdom in 1969 due to ill health and acted as a part-time advisior to the Foreign Office Research Department.

References

1915 births
1971 deaths
People educated at Oundle School
Alumni of St John's College, Cambridge
High Commissioners of the United Kingdom to Singapore
Members of HM Diplomatic Service
Companions of the Order of St Michael and St George
Scots Guards officers
People educated at Walhampton School and Hordle House School
20th-century British diplomats